Outstrider is the second studio album by Norwegian black metal band Abbath. It was released on 5 July 2019 through Season of Mist. Loudwire named it one of the 50 best metal albums of 2019.

Track listing

Personnel

Abbath
 Abbath Doom Occulta – vocals, guitars, songwriting, arrangements (tracks 1, 5, 7, 8)
 Ole André Farstad – guitars (lead, acoustic, baritone), zither, songwriting (guitar leads), arrangements (tracks 1, 5, 7, 8)
 Ukri Suvilehto – drums
 Mia Wallace – bass

Additional Personnel
Endre Kirkesola – keyboards, synthesizers, sampling, additional percussion

Production
Endre Kirkesola – production, engineering, mixing
Maor Appelbaum – mastering

Charts

References

2019 albums
Abbath (band) albums
Season of Mist albums